Lake Laut Tawar is a lake in Central Aceh Regency of Aceh Province, Indonesia. The name  literally means "freshwater sea".

See also 

 List of lakes of Indonesia

References

Laut Tawar
Landforms of Aceh